= Ignify =

Former e-commerce software company

- Industry: software
- Founded: 1999
- Founder: Sandeep Walia; Pankaj Kumar
- Successor: Hitachi Solutions America, Ltd.
- Headquarters: Long Beach, California
- Services: ERP; CRM; POS e-commerce software

Ignify was an ERP, CRM, POS and e-commerce software company headquartered in Long Beach, California with more than 500 employees in 8 countries. Ignify's tagline was "Igniting Ideas. Delivering Results." Ignify was founded by Sandeep Walia and Pankaj Kumar in 1999 in Cerritos, California.

It won Microsoft's "Partner of the Year" award from 2010 to 2015, the Deloitte FAST 500 award of being in fastest growing companies in North America for multiple years. Ignify was also ranked in the Inc 5000 list for multiple years. Ignify won ERP Partner of the Year in Philippines in 2013 and 2014 and won Microsoft Dynamics Partner of the Year Award for Asia Pacific region in 2015.

Hitachi Solutions America, Ltd., acquired Ignify in December 2015.

Ignify's CEO Sandeep Walia ran the Asia Pacific and Australia New Zealand business of Hitachi from 2015 to 2018. Hitachi Solutions went on to win the Microsoft Cloud Partner of the Year award in 2017.
